Accra Technical Training Center (ATTC) is a technical/vocational institution in Accra, Ghana.

ATTC was established in July 1966 as a joint project by the Governments of Ghana and Canada. It was envisioned as a training school to train skilled workers for Ghana's industrial requirements and it marked the first major Canadian support to Ghana in the field of technical education and training.

ATTC trains workers for different occupations and trades. Currently, the school is under the Technical Division of the Ghana Education Service of the Ministry of Education.

History 
In the early 1960s, Arnold Doyle, the Director of Vocational and Technical Education for Saskatchewan, conducted a feasibility study for the establishment of a technical school in Ghana.  It was sponsored by the Canadian External Aid Office.

Doyle became the Canadian Coordinator for the ATTC project. The Ghanaian counterpart was Frank Hutchful, then Ghana's Director of Apprenticeship and Duty Chief Technical Education Officer.

ATTC opened in July, 1966.  The ceremony was attended by Donald S. Macdonald and  A.K. Deku, the then Commissioner for Education in the National Liberation Council (NLC) Government, representing the Government of Ghana.

Principal 
As of July 2019 - Mr. arc Aku Dometey.

Programmes

Core Study Areas 

 English / Liberal Studies
 Integrated Science
Mathematics
 Information Communication & Technology
 ICT
 Technical Drawing

Elective Programme Areas 

Architectural Drafting
 Auto Body Repairs
 Building Construction Technology
 Business System Technician
Computer Technology
 Construction Technician Programme
 Creative Art Technology
Electrical Engineering Technology
 Electronics Engineering
 Fashion
 Industrial Maintenance
Mechanical Engineering technology
 Motor Vehicle Technology
 Plumbing and Gas Fitting Technology
 Refrigeration and Air-Condition Technology
 Small Engine Repairs
Welding and Fabrication Technology
 Wood Construction Technology

Training Workers for Industry 
The ATTC has been organizing short two-week courses for industry since 1994. This was set up with the support of the French government at that time. Courses include Hydraulics, Industrial Electricals, Pneumatics, Programmable Logic Controller, Refrigeration, Welding, and Meteorology (World Bank, 2014).

References

High schools in Ghana